"September" is a song by the American band Earth, Wind & Fire released as a single in 1978 on ARC/Columbia Records. Initially included as a track for The Best of Earth, Wind & Fire, Vol. 1, "September" was very successful commercially and reached No.1 on the US Billboard Hot R&B Songs chart, No.8 on the US Billboard Hot 100, and No.3 on the UK Singles Chart. The song remains a staple of the band's body of work and has been sampled, covered, remixed, and re-recorded numerous times.

It was added to the Library of Congress' National Recording Registry list of sound recordings that "are culturally, historically, or aesthetically important" in 2018.

Composition
"September" is in the key of A major with a tempo of 126beats per minute in common time. The vocals span from A to E. The song has a funk groove based on a four-measure pattern that is consistent between verses and choruses, built on a circle of fifths.

Using a chord progression written by Earth, Wind & Fire guitarist Al McKay, vocalist Maurice White and songwriter Allee Willis wrote the song over one month. Willis was initially bothered by the gibberish "ba-dee-ya" lyric White used through the song, and begged him to rewrite it: "I just said, 'What the fuck does 'ba-dee-ya' mean?' And he essentially said, 'Who the fuck cares?' I learned my greatest lesson ever in songwriting from him, which was never let the lyric get in the way of the groove." The song was included on the band's first compilation—The Best of Earth, Wind & Fire, Vol. 1—solely to boost sales with original content.

Although several theories about the significance of the date have been suggested, the songwriter Maurice White claimed he simply chose the 21st due to how it sounded when sung. His wife, Marilyn White, however, claimed that September21 was the due date of their son, Kahbran, according to lyricist Allee Willis.

Personnel
Earth, Wind & Fire
 Maurice White – lead and background vocals, production
 Philip Bailey – lead and background vocals, congas
 Verdine White – background vocals, bass guitar
 Johnny Graham – guitar
 Al McKay – background vocals, electric guitar
 Larry Dunn – keyboards
 Ralph Johnson – drums, percussion
 Fred White – drums
 Rahmlee Michael Davis – trumpet
Michael Harris – trumpet
 Louis Satterfield – trombone
 Andrew Woolfolk – soprano saxophone

Technical personnel
Charles Stepney – arrangement, production

Reception
"September" has been one of the biggest commercial and critical successes of Earth, Wind & Fire's career, and vocalist Philip Bailey considers it one of the group's best songs. The song was certified silver by the British Phonographic Industry and certified gold in the US (until the RIAA lowered the sales levels for certified singles in 1989, a Gold single equaled 1million units sold.) "September" was later certified Gold for digital sales by the RIAA, and has sold over 2million digital copies in the US as of September 2017.  Record World called it a "smooth, quick song that captures the mood of autumn nostalgia, and should capture radio audiences too. " In 2021, Rolling Stone included "September" at No.65 on their updated list of the "500 Greatest Songs of All Time."

"September" is one of the group's biggest hits in several decades of performing. A 2005 retrospective on Earth, Wind & Fire by Billboard ranked this song sixth on their top singles. Earth, Wind & Fire recorded a new version of the song, retitled "December", for their 2014 Christmas album Holiday.

Cultural impact
Sisqo and Vitamin C cover the song during the closing credits of the film Get Over It (2001).

In the 2006 film Night at the Museum, "September" is played on the last scene before the end credits.

In the United Kingdom the song has been popular as the basis of football chants at a number of clubs: according to a Guardian article this originated at Newcastle United F.C. where fans started singing a chant about player Chancel Mbemba in the autumn of 2015. It was also adapted by fans of the England national football team at the 2018 FIFA World Cup in Russia: "Woah, England are in Russia / Woah, drinking all the vodka / Woah, England’s going all the way".

A version featuring the band accompanied by Anna Kendrick and Justin Timberlake is featured in the 2016 film Trolls. It was released on September 23, 2016, as part of the Trolls: Original Motion Picture Soundtrack.

The 2014 Big Sean single "IDFWU" uses a slowed-down sample of the "ba-dee-ya" chorus in its closing ad-libs.

The 2016 film The Nice Guys features "September" (and also "Boogie Wonderland") being played at a Hollywood party. During the same year the song was played many times at the Raglan Road Bar, Tramore, Co. Waterford, Ireland to indicate that Scott O'Donohue had turned 18, the legal drinking age in the Republic of Ireland. It was never actually his birthday.

The 2019 film Polar features the song playing during its opening sequence, with the characters singing along to it together after pulling off a successful hit.

The song is one of six randomly-selected songs that may play on the Guardians of the Galaxy: Cosmic Rewind roller coaster, which opened in May of 2022 at Walt Disney World’s EPCOT theme park.

Comedian Demi Adejuyigbe is known for creating annual videos of himself dancing to the song on September 21; he began this tradition in 2016 and each year receives millions of YouTube views. He concluded the annual events in 2021 with a video that featured Earth, Wind & Fire.

With "September" changed to "December", the song appears in a 2022 Christmas TV commercial for Kohl's.

Charts

Weekly charts

Year-end charts

Sales and certifications

"September '99"

A remix of the song by English dance music duo Phats and Small called "September '99" was issued in 1999 on the compilation album The Ultimate Collection. The single reached No. 1 on the RPM Canadian Dance Songs chart, No. 4 on the UK Dance Chart and No. 25 on the UK Singles Chart.

Charts

Weekly charts

Year-end charts

Kirk Franklin version

Kirk Franklin released a cover of "September" in 2007 on Stax Records. The song reached No. 17 on the Billboard Adult R&B Songs chart and No. 26 on the Billboard Hot Gospel Songs chart. Frankin's rendition was produced by Maurice White and appears on the 2007 tribute album Interpretations: Celebrating the Music of Earth, Wind & Fire, and was released as the lead single to promote the album.

Critical reception
Steve Jones of USA Today wrote: "Franklin turns the energetic 'September' into a gospel-fueled romp."
James Christopher Monger of AllMusic found "Kirk Franklin offering up an impeccable, if nearly identical rendition of 'September'." Mike Joseph of PopMatters said "Kirk Franklin takes the band's 'September' (literally, by sampling the original version) and refashions it into an anthem of survival, using 'September' as a metaphor for a time when things aren't going so well, and using his talented choir of singers to give the lyrics a jubilant reading." People exclaimed "Kirk Franklin turns 'September' into a rousing celebration of faith."

References

Further reading
The Best of Earth, Wind & Fire Songbook, published by Hal Leonard LLC (1989)

External links
Music video from Earth, Wind & Fire's site

1978 singles
1978 songs
1999 singles
American Record Corporation singles
Columbia Records singles
Disco songs
Earth, Wind & Fire songs
Internet memes introduced in 2016
Song recordings produced by Charles Stepney
Song recordings produced by Maurice White
Songs written by Al McKay
Songs written by Allee Willis
Songs written by Maurice White
Stax Records singles
United States National Recording Registry recordings